Soucy may refer to:

Places:
Soucy, Aisne, a commune in the department of Aisne
Soucy, Yonne, a commune in the department of Yonne

People:
Soucy (surname)